Costin D. Neniţescu in some scientific publication written as Nenitzescu (15 July 1902 – 28 July 1970) was a prominent Romanian chemist, and a professor at the Polytechnic University of Bucharest. He was a member of the Romanian Academy, a corresponding member of the German Academy of Sciences in Berlin, and a member of the Leopoldina Academy of Natural Scientists in Halle-Saale.

Education and career
After completing in 1920 his secondary studies at Gheorghe Lazăr High School, Neniţescu continued his studies at the Polytechnic Institute in Zürich and Ludwig Maximilian University in Munich, where he was one of the favorite students of Hans Fischer.

He studied Friedel–Crafts-like reactions in the series of aliphatic hydrocarbons, the mechanism of the isomerization of cyclobasics, the halogen migration in cycles and chains, reactions induced by carbonium ions, and others. He identified a group of naphthenic acids in Romanian crude oil. He searched for ways of obtaining cyclobutadiene, while explaining the chemistry of this unstable substance and isolating its dimers.

His research interests were also in the oxidation of open-chain and aromatic hydrocarbons with chromic acid and chromic oxychloride. He found new methods for the synthesis of pyrylium salts (Balaban–Nenitzescu–Praill synthesis), of carbenes, tryptamine, serotonin, two new syntheses for the indole nucleus, and a new method of polymerisation of ethylene.

His research was substantiated in more than 200 papers. His remarkable technical and scientific activity helped develop the chemical industry in Romania. A detailed biography is available in 

One of his preferred quote is: "To be able to convey science you have to be yourself a creative scientist, or at least you should strive to be".

In his honor, the chemistry contest "C.D. Neniţescu" is organized yearly at the Polytechnic University of Bucharest.

Main works
 "Organic Chemistry" (2 volumes; 1st print was in 1928; the 6th print was published in 1965)
 "General Chemistry" (2nd print was published in 1963).

See also
Nenitzescu indole synthesis

References

External links

 Neniţescu's biography

Romanian chemists
20th-century Romanian inventors
Titular members of the Romanian Academy
Academic staff of the Politehnica University of Bucharest
Ludwig Maximilian University of Munich alumni
Gheorghe Lazăr National College (Bucharest) alumni
1902 births
1970 deaths
Members of the Romanian Academy of Sciences
Members of the German Academy of Sciences at Berlin